The R726 is a Regional Route in South Africa. Its north-western terminus is the R26 at Zastron, Free State. It heads south-east into the Eastern Cape to meet the R392 near Sterkspruit.

Route
The north end of the road begins at a junction with R26 (Regional Route 26) near Zastron. There, the road traverses southeast with an inverted V configuration near the other terminus. The road ends at the junction of R392 and R393.

The road is sometimes used by smugglers to Lesotho, which has more porous borders than the borders near the capital of Maseru.

References 

Regional Routes in the Eastern Cape
Regional Routes in the Free State (province)